Skipton is a town in North Yorkshire, England.

Skipton may also refer to:

Skipton, Victoria, Australia, a town
Skipton Football Club
Skipton (UK Parliament constituency), a county constituency in the West Riding of Yorkshire from 1885 to 1983
Skipton Rural District, a rural district in the West Riding of Yorkshire from 1894 to 1974
Skipton Girls' High School, Skipton, North Yorkshire
The Skipton Academy, Skipton, North Yorkshire
Richard Shipton (died 1726?), a pirate whose last name is occasionally spelled Skipton
Skipton (horse), winner of the 1941 Melbourne Cup - see List of Melbourne Cup winners

See also
Skipton Building Society
Skipton Castle
Skipton railway station
Skipton railway line, Victoria, Australia
Skipton Woods
Skipton Golf Club, North Yorkshire
Skipton-on-Swale, North Yorkshire
RAF Skipton-on-Swale, an ex-Royal Air Force station